Noma Dumezweni (born 28 July 1969) is a British actress. In 2006, she won the Laurence Olivier Award for Best Performance in a Supporting Role for her performance as Ruth Younger in A Raisin in the Sun at the Lyric Hammersmith Theatre. In 2017, she won the Laurence Olivier Award for Best Actress in a Supporting Role for her performance as Hermione Granger in the original West End run of Harry Potter and the Cursed Child; she reprised the role for the show's original Broadway run and, in 2018, was nominated for the Tony Award for Best Featured Actress in a Play.

Personal life
Born in Swaziland to South African parents, Dumezweni lived in Botswana, Kenya and Uganda. She arrived in England as a refugee on 17 May 1977 with her sister and mother. She first lived in Felixstowe, Suffolk, where she was educated, before moving to London. She has a daughter, Qeiva, born in 2007.

Theatre

Early work
Dumezweni's work in theatre includes: President of an Empty Room and The Hour We Knew Nothing Of Each Other at the National Theatre, London; A Raisin in the Sun for the Young Vic at the Lyric Hammersmith, London (for which she won her first Laurence Olivier Award for Best Performance in a Supporting Role); A Midsummer Night's Dream, The Master and Margarita, Nathan the Wise and The Coffee House at Chichester Festival Theatre, Six Characters in Search of an Author in the Chichester Festival production at the Gielgud Theatre and The Bogus Woman at the Traverse and the Bush.

Royal Shakespeare Company
Domezweni performed in the 1999 Macbeth with Anthony Sher as the First Witch. In 2002, she played Charmian in Antony and Cleopatra and Ursula in Much Ado About Nothing for the RSC. In 2006, she performed in Breakfast with Mugabe.

She returned to the RSC in 2009-11. In spring of 2009 she appeared in the RSC's The Winter's Tale. She also played Olyana in The Grainstone, Calphurnia in Julius Caesar, the Nurse in Romeo and Juliet, Morgan Le Fay in Le Morte d'Arthur, the Doctor in Little Eagles, and Alice in Adelaide Road.

Other theatres
In 2012, she played Rita in Belong at Royal Court Theatre. In 2013, she played Mistress Quickly and Alice in Henry V starring Jude Law at the Noël Coward Theatre. At Royal Court, she played Mrs. Twit in The Twits, a stage adaptation of the story by Roald Dahl of the same name.

In 2013–2014, she appeared in A Human Being Died That Night at the Fugard Theater in Cape Town, the Market Theatre in Johannesburg, which later transferred to the Hampstead Theatre in London. In 2015, the show moved to Brooklyn Academy of Music (BAM) and her was lauded for her "impeccable performance". She starred in Linda at London's Royal Court Theatre in November 2015, stepping into the role vacated by Kim Cattrall with a few days' notice before press night. Awarding the production five stars, the Daily Telegraphs chief theatre critic Dominic Cavendish wrote: "If they can bottle and mass-produce whatever it is that Noma Dumezweni has got then, please, I want to order a life-time's supply." In 2014, she played Hippolita in 'Tis Pity She's A Whore at the Sam Wanamaker Playhouse. In 2015, she played Don José in Carmen Disruption, an adaptation of Georges Bizet's Carmen.

In December 2015, it was announced that Dumezweni had been cast as Hermione Granger in Harry Potter and the Cursed Child. On the announcement, theatre critic Kate Maltby described her as "an actress who consistently engages and enthrals." The casting of the black Dumezweni as Hermione sparked fervent discussion, to which J. K. Rowling responded that Hermione's skin was never specified as white. In 2017, she won her second Laurence Olivier Award for Best Performance in a Supporting Role. Because of her performance in the role, Dumezweni was listed as one of BBC's 100 women during 2018. She reprised her role on Broadway at the Lyric Theatre in 2018.

In 2022, she played Nora Helmer in Lucas Hnath's A Doll's House, Part 2.

Television
Dumezweni appeared on numerous television shows, and in 2018, she starred in Black Earth Rising, the Hugo Blick drama about the prosecution of war criminals. She played the marine biologist Fiffany in the HBO Max comedy series Made for Love (2021–2022).

In 2020, she appeared in the HBO series The Undoing alongside Nicole Kidman, Hugh Grant, and Donald Sutherland. The series received several nominations at the Golden Globes and Emmy Awards. She plays Haley Fitzgerald, a powerhouse attorney hired by a wealthy New York psychotherapist (Kidman) to represent her husband (Grant), a pediatric cancer doctor who has been charged with the brutal killing of his mistress. This role enabled Dumezweni to reach an American audience thanks to the success of the series.

In 2022, Dumezweni appeared in the Netflix series The Watcher as the private investigator hired by the Brannock family, Theodora Birch.

Film
Dumezweni has had several roles in feature films, including Miss Penny Farthing in Disney’s Mary Poppins Returns in 2018. In 2019, she played Edith Sikelo in The Boy Who Harnessed the Wind, directed by and starring Chiwetel Ejiofor. She played Dionne Davis in Peter Hedges' large ensemble drama The Same Storm and critic Stephen Farber wrote, her "powerhouse performance strikes the right mournful but modestly hopeful note as we exit the theater." She has been cast in Disney's live-action adaptation of The Little Mermaid as Queen Selina, a new character created for the film, and will join Liam Neeson in the cast for the forthcoming film Retribution.

Acting credits

Film

Television

Stage

Radio
In radio, she has appeared in Jambula Tree, Seven Wonders of the Divided World, From Fact to Fiction, From Freedom to the Future, Handprint, Jane's Story, Sagila, Shylock, The Farming of Bones, The No. 1 Ladies Detective Agency, The Seven Ages of Car, The Bogus Woman and Breakfast with Mugabe.

She voiced various roles in the BBC Radio 4 dramatic recordings of Ursula K. Le Guin's Earthsea and The Left Hand of Darkness. From 2004-2014, she intermittently voiced characters for the long-running BBC Radio 4 The No. 1 Ladies' Detective Agency.

Audiobooks
She voiced the young adult adventure series Steeplejack by A. J. Hartley that is set in an imaginary world loosely resembling Victorian South Africa.

Accolades

See also
 List of British actors

References

External links
 

1969 births
BBC 100 Women
Black British actresses
British people of South African descent
English stage actresses
English television actresses
Laurence Olivier Award winners
Living people
Swazi emigrants to the United Kingdom
Swazi people of South African descent
Theatre World Award winners